Muhammad Saqlain Anwar Sipra is a Pakistani politician who had been a Member of the Provincial Assembly of the Punjab, from 2002 to May 2018.

Early life and education
He was born on 14 August 1977 in Jhang.

He graduated in 1997 from Government College, Lahore and has the degree of Bachelor of Arts.

Political career
He was elected to the Provincial Assembly of the Punjab as an independent candidate from Constituency PP-75 (Jhang-III) in 2002 Pakistani general election. He received 21,708 votes and defeated Mehr Muhammad Nawaz Bharwana, a candidate of the National Alliance.

He was re-elected to the Provincial Assembly of the Punjab as a candidate of Pakistan Muslim League (Q) from Constituency PP-75 (Jhang-III) in 2008 Pakistani general election. He received 24,298 votes and defeated Mehr Muhammad Nawaz Bharwana, an independent candidate.

He was re-elected to the Provincial Assembly of the Punjab as a candidate of Pakistan Muslim League (N) from Constituency PP-76 (Chiniot-IV-Cum-Jhang) in 2013 Pakistani general election. In December 2013, he was appointed as Parliamentary Secretary for Auqaf and religious affairs.

References 

Living people
Punjabi people
1977 births
Punjab MPAs 2013–2018
Punjab MPAs 2002–2007
Punjab MPAs 2008–2013
Pakistan Muslim League (N) politicians
Government College University, Lahore alumni